The A947 is a single-carriageway road in Scotland that links Aberdeen to Banff via several towns in Aberdeenshire, including Newmachar, Oldmeldrum, Fyvie and Turriff.

Approximately half a mile before Oldmeldrum are views of Bennachie. 

The A947 has a poor safety record, with over 20 fatal crashes occurring between 2005 and 2018.

References

9-0947
9-0947